The 2018 PBA D-League Aspirants Cup was the first conference of the 2017-18 PBA Developmental League season. It was opened on January 18, 2018 at the Ynares Sports Arena and competed by 13 teams and it was finished on May 1, 2018 where the Zark's Burger - LPU defeated the Che'Lu Bar & Grill in the best-of-3 finals showdown, 2 games to 1 and clinching their first ever title in their franchise.

Tournament Format 
 Ten teams will play in a single round-robin elimination phase. 
 Only the top six teams will only make it to the playoffs after the elimination round.
 #1 & #2 seeds will head straight to the semifinals, where #3-#6 seeds will undergo in the quarterfinals.
 The Semifinals and the Championship will both be contested in a best-of-3 series.

Standings
These are the final team standings at the end of elimination round:

Schedule

Results

Playoffs

Quarterfinals

(#3) CEU Scorpions vs. (#6) Zark's Jawbreakers

(#4) Che'lu Bar & Grill Revellers vs. (#5) Gamboa Coffee Mixers

Semifinals

(#1) Akari-Adamson Falcons vs. (#4) Che'lu Bar & Grill Revellers

(#2) vs. (#6) Zark's Jawbreakers

Finals 
The finals is a best-of-three series, the team to win two games win the championship.

Awards

References

External links
Official website

Aspirant's Cup
2018
2018 in Philippine sport